Remingtonocetus is an extinct genus of early cetacean freshwater aquatic mammals of the family Remingtonocetidae endemic to the coastline of the ancient Tethys Ocean during the Eocene. It was named after naturalist Remington Kellogg.

History of discovery

 named Protocetus harudiensis based on a partial skeleton, the type specimen found in the Lutetian shallow subtidal mudstone in the Harudi Formation, India.  renamed it Remingtononocetus harudiensis due to morphological differences from protocetus.

Remingtonocetus domandaensis was named by  based on a partial skeleton found in a Lutetian coastal shale in the Domanda Formation of Pakistan.
Remingtonocetus is larger, has a broader rostrum, and longer premolars than Andrewsiphius. It is smaller than, has more gracile premolars and molars than Dalanistes. R. harudiensis differs from R. domandaensis in molar morphology.

Description

Remingtonocetus was a small cetacean with R. harudiensis weighing .  interpreted R. domandaensis as an older and more generalized species than R. harudiensis. Based on a morphological analysis, they concluded that the hindlimbs of Remingtonocetus were probably not weight-bearing, and that (1) the fused sacrum indicates a limitation in tail-powered locomotion, and (2) the presence of powerful hip extensors and femoral adductors indicates that Remingtonocetus was an efficient and specialized foot-powered swimmer.

Remingtonocetus had four working and usable limbs, a slender whale-like body with long tail and slender, hydrodynamic head.

Taxonomy
Its type is Protocetus harudiensis.

See also

 Evolution of cetaceans

Notes

References

 
 
 
 
 
 
 
 
 
 
 
 
 
 

Remingtonocetidae
Eocene mammals of Asia
Fossil taxa described in 1986
Prehistoric cetacean genera